The Khvorheh Mansion is a historical mansion and temple from the Parthian Empire and is located in Mahallat County, Markazi Province.

References 

Fire temples in Iran
Mansions in Iran
Religious buildings and structures in Iran
Zoroastrianism in Iran